Luis Alberto Noguera Urquia (born October 12, 1973 in Caracas) is a Venezuelan taekwondo practitioner, who competed in the men's heavyweight category. He retrieved a bronze medal in the 83-kg division at the 1993 World Taekwondo Championships in New York City, New York, United States, clinched the gold at the 1999 Pan American Games in Winnipeg, Manitoba, Canada, and represented his nation Venezuela at the 2004 Summer Olympics.

Noguera emerged himself on Venezuela's sporting fame at the 1999 Pan American Games in Winnipeg, Manitoba, Canada, where he edged Mexico's Rodrigo Martínez for the gold medal in the men's over-80 kg division.

At the 2004 Summer Olympics in Athens, Noguera qualified for the Venezuelan squad in the men's heavyweight class (+80 kg), by placing third and granting a berth from the World Olympic Qualifying Tournament in Paris, France. He crashed out early in the opening round by a marginal 5–8 decision to a lanky 6-foot-6 Moroccan fighter Abdelkader Zrouri. Following Zrouri's immediate defeat to Greek crowd favorite Alexandros Nikolaidis in the quarterfinals, Noguera denied his chance to proceed into the repechage bracket for the Olympic bronze medal.

References

External links

1973 births
Living people
Venezuelan male taekwondo practitioners
Olympic taekwondo practitioners of Venezuela
Taekwondo practitioners at the 2004 Summer Olympics
Taekwondo practitioners at the 2007 Pan American Games
Pan American Games gold medalists for Venezuela
Sportspeople from Caracas
Pan American Games medalists in taekwondo
World Taekwondo Championships medalists
Taekwondo practitioners at the 1999 Pan American Games
Medalists at the 1999 Pan American Games
20th-century Venezuelan people
21st-century Venezuelan people